John Doubleday may refer to:

 John Doubleday (restorer) (about 1798 – 1856), British craftsperson and restorer
 John Doubleday (sculptor) (born 1947), British painter and sculptor
 John Gordon Doubleday (1920–1982), British diplomat

See also
 Doubleday (surname)
 John Doebley, American geneticist